The Source Presents: Hip Hop Hits, Volume 4 is the fourth annual music compilation album to be contributed by The Source magazine. Released December 12, 2000 and distributed by Def Jam Recordings, Hip Hop Hits Volume 4 features seventeen hip hop and rap hits. It went to number 35 on the Top R&B/Hip Hop Albums chart and peaked at number 43 on the Billboard 200 album chart.  The compilation is tagged as the "Special 2000 Millennium Edition" (according to the artwork album cover).

This album is the third in the Hip Hop Hits series not to feature an R&B/Hip Hop or a pop hit in the number-one position, but two songs were number-one Hot Rap Tracks hits: "Country Grammar" and "Wobble Wobble". Volume 4 is the first to feature rapper Benzino at the time he became the controversial co-owner of The Source.

Track listing
Credits adapted from Discogs.

Charts

Weekly charts

References

Hip hop compilation albums
2000 compilation albums